Gary Michael Bennett (born 20 September 1963) is an English retired professional footballer. He played for six different clubs in the Football League, with the majority of appearances being made for Chester City and Wrexham.

Playing career

Early playing career
Bennett began his football career playing for Skelmersdale United and his local team Kirkby Town. Bennett began his full-time playing career when he joined Wigan Athletic, playing in the Preston League in October 1984. At the end of the season, Bennett appeared at Wembley Stadium for Wigan in the final of the Associate Members' Cup, which ended in a 3–1 win over Brentford. However, Bennett was soon on the move as he followed manager Harry McNally to Chester City, where 'Psycho', as he was known, scored 13 league goals in 43 appearances as the club achieved promotion from Division Four.

Bennett scored 23 times in 1986–87 but his season was overshadowed by his tackle in an FA Cup tie against Sheffield Wednesday that left opponent Ian Knight with his leg broken in 7 places. The matter was eventually settled out of court a decade later.
In November 1988 Bennett moved on to Southend United for £25,000 (scoring against Chester in Southend's 4–2 win later in the month) but by March 1990 he was back at Chester, again for a £25,000 fee. He remained there until the end of the 1991–92 season, scoring the winner at Stoke City in April 1992 that effectively sealed Division Three survival for Chester.

Wrexham career 
After turning down a new one-year contract with Chester, Bennett joined their arch rivals Wrexham and enjoyed the most prolific spell of his career. He struck 16 goals as the club achieved promotion in 1992–93 and then struck 39 and 47 times in the next two seasons.

Tranmere Rovers 
Bennett was transferred for £300,000 by Wrexham manager Brian Flynn to Tranmere Rovers in the summer of 1995.

Return to Chester 
Bennett moved back to Chester in the summer of 1997 for £50,000, registering 12 goals by early November in his first season back. He failed to add any more during the season and would manage just one more (the winner at his former club Southend in August 1998) before injury forced him to retire from the game in August 1999.

Post playing career

In July 2014, he was a participant on the television series Come Dine with Me alongside his wife Linda. Gary has appeared at many legends dinners at Wrexham AFC in recent years. This role is where a Wrexham AFC legend accommodates VIP guest to dinner at their home matches.

He also plays as a pianist for the band the unspecials that regularly headline skemfest.

Honours
Individual
PFA Team of the Year: 1994–95 Second Division

References

Bibliography

External links
 
BBC Player Profile
Wrexham FC profile

1963 births
Living people
People from Kirkby
Skelmersdale United F.C. players
Wigan Athletic F.C. players
Chester City F.C. players
Southend United F.C. players
Wrexham A.F.C. players
Tranmere Rovers F.C. players
Preston North End F.C. players
English Football League players
English footballers
Association football forwards
Knowsley United F.C. players